Max E. Williams is a Canadian film and television actor best known for his lead role in the IFC television series Bullet in the Face.

References

External links

Canadian male film actors
Canadian male television actors
Living people
Place of birth missing (living people)
Year of birth missing (living people)